The Authority is a Nigerian daily newspaper published by The Authority Media & Publications Limited and owned by Ifeanyi Ubah. Divided into three titles (The Authority Daily, The Authority Saturday and The Authority Sunday), the newspaper was launched on October 19, 2015, as a multicultural community paper covering national and international news, entertainment, sports, lifestyle and leisure.

See also

List of Nigerian newspapers

References

External links

Publications established in 2015
Daily newspapers published in Nigeria
2015 establishments in Nigeria